The 2011 Copa América knockout stage was the elimination stage of the Copa América, following the group stage. It began on 16 July 2011 and consisted of the quarter-finals, the semi-finals, the third-place play-off, and the final held at the Estadio Monumental Antonio Vespucio Liberti on 24 July, in Buenos Aires. Different from previous tournaments, 30 minutes of extra time were played if any match in the final stages finished tied after regulation; previously the match would go straight to a penalty shoot-out.

All times are local, Argentina Time (UTC−03:00).

Qualified teams
The top two placed teams from each of the three groups, plus the two best-placed third teams, qualified for the knockout stage.

Bracket

Quarter-finals

Colombia vs Peru

Argentina vs Uruguay

Brazil vs Paraguay

Chile vs Venezuela

Semi-finals

Peru vs Uruguay

Paraguay vs Venezuela

Third place play-off

Final

References

External links
Copa América 2011 Official Site

Final stages
final
f
knock
2011 in Colombian football
2011 in Peruvian football
knock
2011 in Paraguayan football
final
Argentina–Uruguay football rivalry